Aleksei Anatolievich Guschin (born 21 October 1971) is a Russian former football defender.

He capped for USSR U-20 team at 1991 FIFA World Youth Championship.

External links

1971 births
Footballers from Moscow
Living people
Soviet footballers
Soviet Union youth international footballers
Soviet Union under-21 international footballers
Russian footballers
Russia under-21 international footballers
Association football defenders
PFC CSKA Moscow players
Russian Premier League players
FC Dynamo Moscow players
FC Rostov players
FC Moscow players
FC Volgar Astrakhan players